Àngel Òdena is a Spanish operatic baritone.

Biography 

Born in Tarragona, Spain, he has a degree in Geography and History. He started studying singing and piano in his native town with Mercè Obiol and Dolors Aldea, and continued his studies at the Accademia Lirica in Mantua with Katia Ricciarelli and later with Eduardo Giménez. His debut was in 1994 in La Bohème, at the Teatro Petruzzelli in Bari.

Repertory

Zarzuela

Luisa Fernanda
Katiuska
La de Manojo de Mosas
Pan y toros
La del Soto del Parral
La revoltosa

Spanish Opera

Merlín
Margarita la Tornera
La Dolores
Atlantida
Una voce in off
El gato con botas

Sources
Albesa, Isaac "Àngel Òdena debutará en Verona" (in Spanish), Diari de Tarragona, 28 June 2009
Diputació de Tarragona, El baríton Àngel Òdena, investit conciliari d'honor al Palau de la Diputació (in Catalan), 20 October 2008
Gonzalez, Angel, Angel Odena Barítono: «Debes llevar la música de Wagner a tu terreno» (in Spanish), La Voz de Asturias 8 October 2005

External links
Official website

Living people
Opera singers from Catalonia
21st-century Spanish male opera singers
Spanish operatic baritones
People from Tarragona
Year of birth missing (living people)